Monon Park Dancing Pavilion is a historic dance hall building located at Cedar Lake, Lake County, Indiana.  It was built in 1897, as a one-story, open air frame building supported by brick piers.  The building measures 55 feet by 110 feet and has a massive gable on hip roof with deeply overhanging eaves. It displays some Stick / Eastlake movement design elements. The building was acquired in 1915 by the Moody Memorial Bible Church, who enclosed and enlarged the original structure. A restoration project was underway in 2013.

It was listed in the National Register of Historic Places in 1981.

References

Commercial buildings on the National Register of Historic Places in Indiana
Commercial buildings completed in 1897
Buildings and structures in Lake County, Indiana
National Register of Historic Places in Lake County, Indiana